The 1962 Australian Grand Prix was a motor race for Formula Libre cars, held at the Caversham circuit in Western Australia, Australia on 18 November 1962. It was the twenty seventh Australian Grand Prix and the sixth and final race in the 1962 Australian Drivers' Championship. The Grand Prix meeting was organised by the Western Australian Sporting Car Club Inc.

Held at the former United States Navy air base in still remote Western Australia, the race had just ten starters, seven of which had made the long journey across the Nullarbor Plain from the eastern states, and three of which were local entries. It was the third of only four Australian Grands Prix to be contested in Western Australia with the next held in 1979.

Bruce McLaren won his first Australian Grand Prix, beginning a new era for the race in which the results would be dominated by professional drivers and teams rather than the gentleman amateurs who had won most of the post-war AGP races. It also began an AGP rivalry between the two senior drivers from the region, McLaren and Jack Brabham who were already long-time rivals in Formula One racing.

Race classification 

Results as follows.

Additional awards
 1st Australian resident driver: John Youl
 1st Western Australian resident driver: Syd Negus

Notes
 Pole Position: Bruce McLaren - 1:19.6
 Winner's average speed: 145.49 km/h
 Fastest Lap: Jack Brabham, 1:20.0s, 92.65 mph, 149.1 km/h

References

Further reading
 Terry Walker, 1962: Caversham, Around the Houses - The History of Motor Racing in Australia, 1980, pages 16 & 17

External links
 Footage from the 1962 Australian Grand Prix held in Caversham, WA., www.abc.net.au

Grand Prix
Australian Grand Prix
Australian Grand Prix